Hortensio Fucil Herrera (born February 8, 1939) is a retired track and field athlete from Venezuela. He competed in the short- and in the middle-distances. Fucil represented his native country at the 1964 Summer Olympics in Tokyo, Japan. He was second in the 1963 Pan American Games 4 × 400 metres relay (with Víctor Maldonado, Aristides Pineda and Leslie Mentor). In the 1963 Pan American Games Fucil finished fifth in the 400 metres.

References
sports-reference

1939 births
Living people
Venezuelan male middle-distance runners
Venezuelan male sprinters
Athletes (track and field) at the 1964 Summer Olympics
Olympic athletes of Venezuela
Athletes (track and field) at the 1959 Pan American Games
Athletes (track and field) at the 1963 Pan American Games
Pan American Games silver medalists for Venezuela
Pan American Games medalists in athletics (track and field)
Central American and Caribbean Games silver medalists for Venezuela
Competitors at the 1962 Central American and Caribbean Games
Central American and Caribbean Games medalists in athletics
Medalists at the 1963 Pan American Games
20th-century Venezuelan people
21st-century Venezuelan people